Sonata rondo form is a musical form often used during the Classical and Romantic music eras.  As the name implies, it is a blend of sonata and rondo forms.

Structure

Sonata and rondo forms 
Rondo form involves the repeated use of a theme (sometimes called the "refrain") set in the tonic key, alternating with episodes, resulting in forms such as ABACA (the five-part rondo) or ABACADA (the seven-part rondo). In a rondo, the refrain (A) may be varied slightly. The episodes (B, C, D, etc.) are normally in a different key than the tonic.

Sonata form is a classical form composed of three main sections, namely exposition, development, and recapitulation. A sonata may begin with an introduction, which is commonly slower than the remainder of the movement. After that, there is an exposition, whose purpose is to present the movement's main thematic material. This takes the form of one or two themes or theme groups, the second of which is commonly in a related key. The exposition may conclude with a short codetta and/or closing theme and may be repeated. This is followed by the development section, in which existing thematic material may be presented in new harmonic and textural contexts and/or entirely new material may be introduced. Next comes the recapitulation, where all themes or theme groups from the exposition are presented again but now in the tonic key. Sonatas may optionally end with a final large section called the coda.

The following shows the structure of sonata form. In the notation, a single prime (') means "in the dominant" and a double prime (") means "in remote keys".

[A B']exp [C"]dev [A B]recap

Occasionally, sonata form includes an "episodic development," which uses mostly new thematic material.  Two examples are the first movements of Mozart's piano sonata K. 330 and Beethoven's piano sonata Op. 14, no. 1.  The episodic development is often the kind of development that is used in sonata rondo form, to which we now turn.

Sonata rondo form 
Sonata rondo form combines features of the five-part rondo and sonata form. The simplest kind of sonata rondo form is a sonata form that repeats the opening material in the tonic at the end of the exposition and recapitulation sections.

[A B' A]exp [C"]dev [A B A]recap

By adding in these extra appearances of A, the form reads off as AB'AC"ABA, hence the alternation of A with "other" material that characterizes the rondo.  Note that if the development is an episodic development, then C" will be new thematic material—thus increasing the resemblance of sonata rondo form to an actual rondo.

"Six-part" variants 
Mozart sometimes used a variant type of sonata rondo form in which the first "A" section of the recapitulation is omitted. Thus:

[A B' A]exp [C"]dev [B A]recap

Mozart's purpose was perhaps to create a sense of variety by not having the main theme return at such regular intervals. He used the form in the finales of his piano quartets and a number of his piano concertos.

Another six-part sonata rondo form may be written as:

[A B' A]exp [C"]dev [A B]recap

This instance occurs in the 4th movement of Tchaikovsky's Symphony No. 6 in B minor.

Codas 

Often, regular sonata form includes a coda:

[A B']exp [C"]dev [A B]recap [D]coda

This longer version of sonata form has a counterpart in sonata rondo form.

[A B' A]exp [C"]dev [A B A]recap [D]coda

Thus:  AB'AC"ABAD. An example is the last movement of Beethoven's "Pathetique" Sonata, Op. 13.

Sonata rondo form as a variant of rondo form 

It is also possible to describe sonata rondo form by starting out with rondo form and describing how it is transformed to be more like sonata form.  For this explanation, see rondo.

Cuthbert Girdlestone conjectured in his "Mozart and His Piano Concertos" that the sonata rondo form derives also in part from the dances en rondeau of Jean-Philippe Rameau, among others, by structural elaboration, possibly an innovation of Mozart's.

Uses of the sonata rondo form 

Sonata rondo form is almost exclusively used in the finales of multi-movement works.  It is considered a somewhat relaxed and discursive form.  Thus, it is unsuited to an opening movement (typically the musically tightest and most intellectually rigorous movement in a Classical work). It is, exceptionally, used in the opening Andante movement of Haydn's D-major piano sonata Hob. XVI:51.  Here are some movements written in sonata rondo form:

Mozart, Piano Sonata No. 13 in B-Flat Major, K. 333 (1783), last movement
Mozart, Piano Concerto No. 23 in A major, K. 488 (1786), last movement
Mozart, Divertimento for String Trio in E-Flat Major, K. 563, last movement
Haydn, "La Reine" Symphony, Hoboken 1/85 (1785), last movement
Haydn, "Drumroll" Symphony, Hoboken 1/103 (1795), last movement 
Beethoven, two violin and piano sonatas, Op. 12 (1798), last movements
Beethoven, Piano Sonata, Op. 13 (1798), last movement
Beethoven, Piano Sonata, Op. 27, No. 1 (1800–1801), last movement
Beethoven, Piano Sonata, Op. 90, last movement
Beethoven, Violin Concerto, Op. 61 (1806), last movement
Beethoven, Fourth Symphony, Op. 60 (1806), second movement
Beethoven, Sixth Symphony, Op. 68 (1808), last movement
Beethoven, Eighth Symphony, Op. 93 (1812), last movement
Schubert, Death and the Maiden Quartet, D. 810 (1824), last movement
Schubert, Piano Sonata No.21 in Bb major, D. 960 (1827), last movement
Mendelssohn, Violin Concerto in E minor, Op. 64 (1844), last movement
Brahms, Piano Concerto No. 2 in B-flat major, Op. 83 (1881), fourth (last) movement (Allegretto grazioso)
Brahms, Violin Sonata No. 3 in D minor, Op. 108 (1886–1888), fourth (last) movement (Presto agitato)

See also
ABACABA pattern

Notes

References

Further reading
 

Musical form